Capcom Puzzle World is a compilation of puzzle games created by Capcom for the Sony PSP. It was released on February 6, 2007 in the United States and July 13, 2007 in Europe. The game was primarily developed due to the cult classic status of Super Puzzle Fighter II Turbo.

Puzzle World contains 5 puzzle games:

References

External links 
 Puzzle World at IGN 
 Puzzle World at MobyGames

2007 video games
Capcom video game compilations
PlayStation Portable games
PlayStation Portable-only games
Puzzle video games
Multiplayer and single-player video games
Video games developed in the United States
Sensory Sweep Studios games